Walter Gerard Buswell (November 6, 1907 — October 16, 1991), was a Canadian ice hockey defenceman who played eight seasons in the National Hockey League between 1932 and 1940 for the Detroit Red Wings and Montreal Canadiens.

Complexe Walter-Buswell, a building with two hockey rinks in Saint-Eustache, Quebec, Canada, is named after Buswell.

Career statistics

Regular season and playoffs

References

External links
 

1907 births
1991 deaths
Anglophone Quebec people
Canadian expatriate ice hockey players in the United States
Canadian ice hockey forwards
Chicago Shamrocks players
Detroit Olympics (IHL) players
Detroit Red Wings players
Ice hockey people from Montreal
Montreal Canadiens players